n-Butylsodium CH3CH2CH2CH2Na is an organometallic compound with the idealized formula NaC4H9.  Like other simple organosodium compounds, it is polymeric and highly basic. In contrast to n-butyllithium, n-butylsodium is only of specialized academic interest.

Preparation
n-Butylsodium is prepared from n-butyllithium and t-butoxysodium.

Properties
In n-Butylsodium, the Na-C bond has ionic character, with a negative charge on the end carbon atom. n-Butylsodium is insoluble in saturated hydrocarbons.  It reacts with unsaturated hydrocarbons. Soluble adducts are produced with Lewis bases such as tetramethylethylenediamine or tetrahydrofuran.

Reactions
n-Butylsodium reacts with alkylbenzene or allylbenzene compounds to give new organosodium compounds.  With toluene  the major product is benzylsodium.

n-Butylsodium reacts with 1-bromonaphthalene to make 1-sodiumnapthalene and 1-bromobutane, but there are few such metathesis reactions.

References

Organosodium compounds